Eystrup is a municipality in the district of Nienburg, in Lower Saxony, Germany. It is situated on the right bank of the Weser, approx. 15 km north of Nienburg, and 15 km south of Verden. Eystrup was the seat of the former Samtgemeinde ("collective municipality") Eystrup.

References

Nienburg (district)